Admestina wheeleri is a species of jumping spider found in the northern United States and southern Canada. The species was first described in 1888 by George and Elizabeth Peckham.

References

External links 

wheeleri
Spiders of North America
Spiders described in 1888